As of 2015, Marathi has at least two translation available of the Tirukkural, of which one is complete.

Background

The Kural text was translated into Marathi by the Marathi author Pandurang Sadashiv Sane, widely known as Sane Guruji, in 1930. He made the translation while undergoing imprisonment as a political prisoner in the Tiruchirapalli jail. At the prison, he started learning Tamil and studied the Kural and was tempted to translate the work into Marathi. He referred to the works on the Kural by V. V. S. Aiyar and also consulted with fellow Tamil inmates at the prison to get the full import of subtle ideas in the work. Although completed by 1930, only an unofficial print appeared on 17 December 1930 as Sane Guruji was still serving his prison sentence. When he was released from prison in 1948, Sane Guruji started his own press named "Sadhana Prakashan" and the translation was officially published on 28 September 1948. The third and fourth editions were published in 1960 and 1975, respectively, by Continental Prakashan. The Marathi translation by Sane Guruji is a complete translation.

In the meantime, Narayana Govindarao Peshwe and Ganpath Govindarao Peshwe, a lawyer duo from Thulajapur, translated a Hindi translation of the Kural text by Kshemananda into Marathi and published it in the journal Lokamitra from July 1929 to June 1930. However, they translated only the first 89 chapters of the Kural literature because the Hindi translation itself was incomplete and did not contain Book III of the Kural. In May 1930, this translation was published as a book by T. K. Sadekar from his publishing house named Dhananjay Press in Belgaum, Karnataka. Although the said Hindi translation was based on V. V. S. Aiyar's English translation, which Kshemananda claimed that the translation was cross-checked against the Tamil original by a Tamil scholar before publication, the Marathi translation by Peshwe brothers was not cross-checked against the Kural's original version in Tamil. Both Sane Guruji and Peshwe Brothers' translations were in prose.

Although many scholars before him refrained from translating the third book of the Kural (Book of Love), Sane Guruji translated the whole work. In his work, he described about his decision to do so, thus:

Translations

See also
 Tirukkural translations
 List of Tirukkural translations by language

Notes

References

External links
 Thirukkural translations

Marathi
Translations into Marathi